The College of Navarre was one of the colleges of the historic University of Paris, rivaling the Sorbonne and renowned for its library.

History
It was founded by Queen Joan I of Navarre in 1305, who provided for three departments, the arts with 20 students, philosophy with 30 and theology with 20 students.

The queen bequeathed part of her fine hôtel de Navarre in rue Saint André des Arts, together with lands generated rents of 2000 livres p.a. in her counties of  Champagne and Brie. Her trustees decided to sell the Paris property and acquire an ample plot on the Montagne Sainte-Geneviève (rue de la Montagne-Sainte-Geneviève / rue Descartes), right in the Latin Quarter, and build the college anew. The first stone, laid 12 April 1309, was for the college chapel.

Provision was made also for the scholars' support, 4 Paris sous weekly for the artists, 6 for the logicians and 8 for the theologians. These allowances were to continue until the graduates held benefices of the value respectively of 30, 40 and 60 livres. The regulations allowed the theological students a fire, daily, from November to March after dinner and supper for one half-hour. The luxury of benches was forbidden by a commission appointed by Urban V in 1366. On the festival days, the theologians were expected to deliver a collation to their fellow-students of the three classes. The rector at the head of the college, originally appointed by the faculty of the university, was now appointed by the king's confessor. The students wore a special dress and the tonsure and ate in common.

Classes bore little resemblance to today's universities. Subjects were included that are not taught today, such as rhetoric in its classical meaning. The students were required to speak and write only in Latin and all subjects had to be learned by rote. Only after graduation were students allowed to write using their own words or discuss the subjects. At least one of the rectors, Claude D'Espence became rector before he obtained his doctorate.

The College was suppressed at the time of the French Revolution, its library dispersed and its archives lost. Its buildings were assigned to the École polytechnique by Napoleon in 1805

Notable students or teachers

References

 This content originally came from History of the Christian Church

 Historia Medieval del Reyno de Navarra

Navarre
1304 establishments in Europe
1300s establishments in France